Kick is an action video game where the player controls a clown on a unicycle catching falling balloons and Pac-Man characters on the clown's hat. It was released in arcades by Midway in 1981. The game was later renamed Kick Man (sometimes written as Kick-Man). Commodore published a Commodore 64 port in 1982 without the space in the title as Kickman.

Gameplay 
The player controls a clown on a unicycle who moves left and right along the bottom of the screen. Balloons dislodge from several rows at the top and fall. The goal is to catch them on the clown's hat. As the stack of caught ballons grows taller, it becomes more difficult to catch them on the first try. If a balloon falls below the top of the stack, pressing the "kick" button when near the clown's feet launches it back into the air. The main character and ghosts from Pac-Man sometimes stand-in for balloons, having different effects. If an object hits the ground, then the player loses a life.

Kick also has a bonus stage.

Ports 
In 1982, an Atari 2600 version of the game was commissioned by Midway as part of a planned attempt at entering the home video game market. Ultimately deciding against it, Midway sold the port to CBS Electronics, where, despite being nearly complete, it was cancelled for unknown reasons. In 2019, a prototype cartridge was discovered and the ROM was released online.

Reception
Electronic Games wrote in 1983 that the game had been unsuccessful despite "top-notch background graphics and special sounds for effects. Can you imagine a game featuring Pac-Man that didn't make it? Kick Man is it." The Commodore 64 version was somewhat better received, gaining a Certificate of Merit in the category of "1984 Best Arcade-to-Home Video Game/Computer Game Translation" at the 5th annual Arkie Awards.

Legacy
Utopia Software published a clone called Pinhead for the Atari 8-bit family in 1982.

References

External links

1981 video games
Action video games
Arcade video games
Cancelled Atari 2600 games
Commodore 64 games
Midway video games
North America-exclusive video games
Trackball video games
Video games developed in the United States
Video games about clowns